Jacob Manson is a British DOB is March,91 multi platinum-selling music producer, DJ and songwriter best known as a member of house production duo Blonde with Adam Englefield. Manson signed a publishing deal with Sony ATV in 2013. Blonde was then signed by Parlophone in 2014.

With Blonde, Manson has had a number of successful singles including 2014's "I Loved You" featuring Melissa Steel, which peaked at #7 in the UK Singles Chart, and 2015's "All Cried Out" featuring Alex Newell, peaking at #4 in the UK Singles Chart and #1 in the UK Dance Chart. In 2016, Blonde released "Nothing Like This" with UK garage singer Craig David.

In addition to his work with Blonde, Manson has production and writing credits on a number of other successful tracks from artists such as Rudimental, KSI and Ed Sheeran, Craig David, Anne-Marie, The Vamps, Banx & Ranx and Ella Eyre.

Discography

With Blonde

Production and songwriting discography

References

British record producers
British DJs
Living people
British songwriters
Year of birth missing (living people)
Musicians from Bristol